The National Federation Of Industrial Organisations (FIO, Shinsambetsu) was a national trade union federation in Japan.

The federation was a split from Sanbetsu, which took place in 1952.  Always a small organisation, by 1967 it had only three affiliates and a total of 69,839 members.  By 1978, it had 61,000 members, and that year, it formed a loose association with the Federation of Independent Unions (Churitsuroren), intending to merge in the future.  In 1987, it merged with both Churitsuroren and the larger Japanese Confederation of Labour, to form the Japanese Trade Union Confederation.

Affiliates
The following unions were affiliated:

References

National trade union centers of Japan
Trade unions established in 1952
Trade unions disestablished in 1988